Kirsten Beyer is an American science fiction writer, known for her novels based on the Star Trek: Voyager television series. She is a staff writer for Star Trek: Discovery, and co-creator and executive producer of Star Trek: Picard.

She has also written for the Buffyverse.

Career 

Little is known of Beyer's career prior to her involvement with the Star Trek franchise. She briefly worked as an actress and dancer for stage productions in the Los Angeles-area until the mid-1990s. After corresponding with Star Trek: Voyager executive producer Jeri Taylor and expressing an interest in writing for the series, Beyer was invited to pitch for the series. Beyer had previously submitted two spec scripts which were both rejected. She later pitched stories from Voyager season five onward, but none were produced.

In 2004, Beyer was encouraged to send a query package to Pocket Books by her writing partner, Heather Jarman. Her query was accepted, and development of a new Voyager tie-in novel began. However, the editor leading the development moved on to other projects, and the novel under development was never realized. Beyer was later introduced to Marco Palmieri, editor of the Star Trek line at Pocket Books, by Jarman while both were attending the Shore Leave science fiction convention. Palmieri agreed to accept samples of her work, and invited Beyer to write for him a few days later.

Beyer's first novel with Palmieri was Fusion (2005), the second book in the Voyager: String Theory miniseries. A subplot involving the Vulcan character Tuvok was originally pitched as an episode of Voyager tentatively titled "Siren's Song". Another un-produced pitch was reworked as the short story "Isabo's Shirt", anthologized in Distant Shores (2005). Beyer became the lead writer of the Voyager novel series, replacing Christie Golden, with the release of Full Circle in March 2009. She has written eleven Voyager tie-in novels.

In May 2016, Beyer was hired as a staff writer for Star Trek: Discovery. She was recruited because of her familiarity with Star Trek canon, and her experience as a tie-in fiction writer. She has contributed to the Discovery and Star Trek: Picard comics line published by IDW. In 2020, Beyer read for the audiobook edition of To Lose the Earth.

Bibliography

Star Trek: Voyager (2005–2020) 

Star Trek: Voyager tie-in novels published by Simon & Schuster.

Star Trek: Discovery (2017–2020) 

Star Trek: Discovery tie-in comics published by IDW Publishing. Co-written by Mike Johnson. Beyer is credited as "Comic story writer" for most issues.

Star Trek: Picard (2019–2020) 

Star Trek: PicardCountdown comic miniseries is as a prequel to Star Trek: Picard. Artist is Angel Hernández.

Buffy the Vampire Slayer (2008) 

Buffy the Vampire Slayer tie-in novels published by Simon & Schuster.

Short fiction (2005–2009) 
Beyer has contributed to the following short story collections:

Filmography

References

External links 
 
 

Living people
21st-century American novelists
Women science fiction and fantasy writers
American women television writers
American women novelists
Year of birth missing (living people)
21st-century American screenwriters
21st-century American women writers